The Cameron River is a river of New Zealand. It flows southeast from the slopes of Mount Arrowsmith in the Southern Alps / Kā Tiritiri o te Moana, reaching Lake Stream just to the north of the outflow from Lake Heron.

See also
List of rivers of New Zealand

References
Land Information New Zealand - Search for Place Names

Rivers of Canterbury, New Zealand
Rivers of New Zealand